Allen Dorian Nono (born 15 August 1992 in Port-Gentil) is a Gabonese professional footballer who plays as a forward for AS Pélican. He made six appearances for the Gabon national team between 2012 and 2016 and competed at the 2012 Summer Olympics.

Club career
 2009–2011 US Bitam
 2011–2012 USM Libreville
 2012–2013 Olympique Khouribga
 2013–2015 AS Mangasport
 2015–2017 AS Pélican
 2017–2018 Free State Stars
 2018 CF Mounana
 2019– AS Pélican

References

1992 births
Living people
Gabonese footballers
Gabon international footballers
Olympic footballers of Gabon
Footballers at the 2012 Summer Olympics
Association football forwards
US Bitam players
USM Libreville players
AS Mangasport players
Olympique Club de Khouribga players
AS Pélican players
Free State Stars F.C. players
CF Mounana players
Gabonese expatriate footballers
Gabonese expatriate sportspeople in Morocco
Expatriate footballers in Morocco
Gabonese expatriate sportspeople in South Africa
Expatriate soccer players in South Africa
21st-century Gabonese people
2016 African Nations Championship players
Gabon A' international footballers